Aydoğdu is a Turkish word and it may refer to:

Surname
 Aydoğdu (surname)

Places
 Aydoğdu, Amasya, a village in the district of Amasya, Amasya Province, Turkey
 Aydoğdu, Erzincan
 Aydoğdu, Güney
 Aydoğdu, Şenkaya
 Aydoğdu, Tavas, a village in district of Tavas, Denizli Province in Turkey
 Aydoğdu, Yenişehir
 Aydoğdu, Vezirköprü, a village in district of Vezirköprü, Samsun Province, Turkey